Stephen Haliczer is an American historian of Spain, Italy, and the Catholic Church during the Early Modern era.  He is a professor of history at Northern Illinois University.  Haliczer's undergraduate work was done at Bard College and his graduate work at St. Andrews University.  His study of Early Modern Spain has received praise from a variety of other historians, such as Joseph Pérez.  In his books, Haliczer holds to the structural functionalist school of historical thought.

In 2006, he released an educational board game Vatican: Unlock the Secrets of How Men Become Pope.  Based on his research, the game attempts to show the process of selecting a Pope as players first maneuver for position, then vie to be named the new Pope upon the previous Pope's death.

Works
Books:
 
 
 
 
 
  (with coauthor Moshe Lazar)
 

The books concerning the history of Spain have had Spanish-language editions published.  Haliczer has written a variety of articles in journals as well.

References

External links
Stephen Haliczer's works at WorldCat
Vatican Board Game from College of DuPage Press (2011 archive)

Living people
Year of birth missing (living people)
Jewish American historians
American male non-fiction writers
Northern Illinois University faculty
Bard College alumni
Alumni of the University of St Andrews
Historians of Spain
Historians of Italy
Historians of the Catholic Church
Place of birth missing (living people)
20th-century American historians
21st-century American historians